Copp's Hill Burying Ground is a historic cemetery in the North End of Boston, Massachusetts.  Established in 1659, it was originally named "North Burying Ground", and was the city's second cemetery.

History

The cemetery was founded on February 20, 1659, when the town bought land on Copp's Hill from John Baker and Daniel Turell to start the "North Burying Ground".  Now named "Copp's Hill Burying Ground" (although often referred to as "Copp's Hill Burial Ground"), it is the second oldest cemetery in Boston (second only to the King's Chapel Burying Ground founded in 1630). It contains more than 1200 marked graves, including the remains of various notable Bostonians from the colonial era into the 1850s.

The first extension was made on January 7, 1708, when the town bought additional land from Judge Samuel Sewall and his wife Hannah. The land was part of a pasture which Mrs. Sewall had inherited from her father, John Hull, master of the mint.

Benjamin Weld and his wife Nabby sold the second extension to the town for $10,000 on December 18, 1809, soon after they had bought it from Jonathan Merry, who had used it as pasture. Ten years later, Charles Wells, later mayor of Boston, bought a small parcel of land from John Bishop of Medford and used this as a cemetery that was later merged with the adjacent North Burying Ground.  Because of this complicated history, it is no longer possible to discern the original boundaries of the cemetery.

On the Snow Hill Street side are the many unmarked graves of the African Americans who lived in the "New Guinea" community at the foot of the hill. In addition to the graves there are 272 tombs, most of which bear inscriptions that are still legible.

By 1840 the cemetery had fallen into near disuse but the town continued to maintain the site intermittently. By 1878 it was badly neglected.  The cemetery was not an official stop on the Freedom Trail when it was created in 1951 but it has since been added and is much-frequented by tourists and photographers. The site was added to the National Register of Historic Places in 1974.

Notable burials

 William Copp's children
 Shem Drowne, coppersmith, author of the grasshopper weathervane atop Faneuil Hall
 Benjamin Edes, journalist and agitator
 Prince Hall, abolitionist and founder of Black Freemasonry
 Edmund Hartt, master carpenter
 Samuel Mather, Independent minister
 Increase Mather, Puritan minister
 Cotton Mather, Puritan minister
 Robert Newman, one of two patriots who placed the signal lanterns in the steeple of Old North Church for Paul Revere's midnight ride to Lexington and Concord
 John Norman, publisher
 Major Samuel Shaw, first American consul at Canton
 Nicholas Upsall, Puritan and later Quaker leader
 John Webster, Lecturer at Harvard Medical College who murdered George Parkman in 1849
 Phillis Wheatley, first published woman of African descent, poet, former slave
 George Worthylake, first keeper of the Boston Light

See also
 List of cemeteries in Boston

References
 City of Boston Official Freedom Trail Information

Images

External links
 

Cemeteries in North End, Boston
1659 establishments in Massachusetts
Slavery in the United States
African-American history in Boston
African-American cemeteries
Cemeteries on the National Register of Historic Places in Massachusetts
North End, Boston
National Register of Historic Places in Boston